Vladimir Vladimirovich Vagin (born 16 March 1982) is a former Russian professional football player.

Club career
He played two seasons in the Russian Football National League for FC Fakel Voronezh and FC Dynamo Saint Petersburg.

References

External links
 

1982 births
Sportspeople from Pskov
Living people
Russian footballers
Association football defenders
FC Fakel Voronezh players
FC Tyumen players
FC Vityaz Podolsk players
PFC Krylia Sovetov Samara players
FC Dynamo Saint Petersburg players
FC Novokuznetsk players
FC Sever Murmansk players